Pareutropius mandevillei is a species of fish in the family Schilbeidae, the schilbid catfishes.

Description
The species reaches a maximum length 5.8 centimeters (2 inch). Its skin is brownish-silver with some Grey strips.

Distribution and habitat 
It is native to Stanley Pool, Republic of Congo and Zaire.

References

Schilbeidae
Fish described in 1959
Taxa named by Max Poll